Diriliş: Ertuğrul, is a Turkish historical fiction and adventure television series, created by Mehmet Bozdağ, starring Engin Altan Düzyatan in the title role. The successful series has won many awards. Engin Altan Düzyatan won 11 awards with 2 nominations. Below is a list of awards and nominations received by Diriliş: Ertuğrul.

Distinctive International Arab Festivals Awards (DIAFA)

Turquoise Butterfly Awards

International Snow Film Festival

Magazinci Awards

Turkey Youth Awards

Golden Butterfly Awards

Turkey Golden Palm Awards

Other awards

See also
 List of Diriliş: Ertuğrul episodes
 List of Diriliş: Ertuğrul characters
 List of awards and nominations received by Kuruluş: Osman

References

Diriliş: Ertuğrul and Kuruluş: Osman
Lists of awards by television series